Diocese of Port Elizabeth may refer to:

 the Roman Catholic Diocese of Port Elizabeth
 the Anglican Diocese of Port Elizabeth